Anthony Frank Tillim (8 April 1938 – 8 January 2008) was a South African cricketer who played first-class cricket for Natal and Transvaal between 1959 and 1968.

Tillim was a leg-spin bowler. His best first-class figures were 7 for 34 in his first appearance for Transvaal, against Eastern Province in 1961–62. He took 31 wickets at an average of 24.51 in the 1962–63 season, but was not selected for the tour of Australia in 1963–64. His last first-class wicket, a googly that bowled Neil Hawke, gave Transvaal victory over the touring Australians in November 1966 – the first time an Australian team had lost a first-class match in South Africa.

References

External links
 

1938 births
2008 deaths
Cricketers from Johannesburg
South African cricketers
KwaZulu-Natal cricketers
Gauteng cricketers